Burkholderia ubonensis is a species of bacteria in the phylum Pseudomonadota.

References

External links
Type strain of Burkholderia ubonensis at BacDive -  the Bacterial Diversity Metadatabase

Burkholderiaceae
Bacteria described in 2000